The 1998 Amstel Gold Race was the 33rd edition of the annual road bicycle race "Amstel Gold Race", held on Sunday April 25, 1998, in the Dutch province of Limburg. The race stretched 257.3 kilometres, with the start and finish in Maastricht. There were 193 competitors, with 84 cyclists finishing the race.

Result

External links
Results

Amstel Gold Race
1998 in road cycling
1998 in Dutch sport
Amstel Gold Race
April 1998 sports events in Europe